Amelia Strickler (born 24 January 1994) is an American-born, British shot putter who represents Great Britain and England in international athletics events.

Strickler finished sixth at the 2022 Commonwealth Games.  She won gold medals at the 2018 British Athletics Championships and 2020 British Indoor Athletic Championships.

Early life
Strickler was born in Ohio to an American father, Randal Strickler; and a British mother, Cecilia. She has held dual citizenship since birth and chose to represent Great Britain internationally after moving to the United Kingdom with her mother in 2016.

She studied microbiology at Miami University, Ohio.

References

1994 births
Living people
Track and field athletes from Ohio
People from Uttoxeter
Sportspeople from Staffordshire
English female shot putters
British female shot putters
American female shot putters
Commonwealth Games competitors for England
Athletes (track and field) at the 2018 Commonwealth Games
British Athletics Championships winners
Miami RedHawks athletes
English people of American descent